Gerard van Leijenhorst (11 June 1928 – 28 December 2001) was a Dutch politician and chemist. He was a member of the defunct Christian Historical Union (CHU) party and later of the Christian Democratic Appeal (CDA) party.

Education and early career 
Van Leijenhorst attended a Gymnasium in Amersfoort from May 1940 until June 1946, and applied at the Utrecht University in July 1948 majoring in Physics and Chemistry obtaining a Bachelor of Science degree in June 1950 and worked as a student researcher before graduating with a Master of Science degree in Chemistry in July 1954. Van Leijenhorst worked as a chemistry teacher in Almelo from July 1954 until August 1955 and in Gouda from August 1955 until August 1971. Van Leijenhorst also worked as an education administrator for several Protestant educational organisations from March 1966 until August 1971. Van Leijenhorst served on the Municipal Council of Gouda from 1 September 1970 until 1 September 1971.

Election to the House of Representatives 
Van Leijenhorst became a Member of the House of Representatives after Willem Scholten was appointed as State Secretary for Finance in the Cabinet Biesheuvel I after the election of 1971, taking office on 3 August 1971 serving as a frontbencher chairing the special parliamentary committee for Cultural Minorities and spokesperson for Education, Social Work, Culture and deputy spokesperson for Media and Kingdom Relations. After the election of 1981 Van Leijenhorst was appointed as State Secretary for the Interior in the Cabinet Van Agt II, taking office on 11 September 1981. The Cabinet Van Agt II fell just seven months into its term on 12 May 1982 after months of tensions in the coalition and continued to serve in a demissionary capacity until the first cabinet formation of 1982 when it was replaced by the caretaker Cabinet Van Agt III with Van Leijenhorst continuing as State Secretary for the Interior, taking office on 29 May 1982. After the election of 1982 Van Leijenhorst returned as a Member of the House of Representatives, taking office on 16 September 1982. Following the second cabinet formation of 1982 Van Leijenhorst was appointed as State Secretary for Education and Sciences in the Cabinet Lubbers I, taking office on 8 November 1982. After the election of 1986 Van Leijenhorst again returned as a Member of the House of Representatives, taking office on 3 June 1986. Following the cabinet formation of 1986 Van Leijenhorst was not given a cabinet post in the new cabinet, the Cabinet Lubbers I was replaced by the Cabinet Lubbers II on 14 July 1986 and he continued to serve in the House of Representatives as a frontbencher chairing the parliamentary committee for Education and Sciences and spokesperson for Education, Science, Culture and deputy spokesperson for Social Work and Media. In October 1993 Van Leijenhorst announced that he wouldn't stand for the election of 1994 and he continued to serve until the end of the parliamentary term on 17 May 1994.

Van Leijenhorst was known for his abilities as a manager and policy wonk. Van Leijenhorst continued to comment on political affairs until his retirement in 1998, he died 3 years later at the age of 73.

Decorations

References

External links

Official
  Drs. G. (Gerard) van Leijenhorst Parlement & Politiek

1928 births
2001 deaths
Christian Democratic Appeal politicians
Christian Historical Union politicians
Dutch anti-abortion activists
20th-century Dutch chemists
Dutch members of the Dutch Reformed Church
Dutch nonprofit directors
Dutch lobbyists
Dutch political activists
Dutch school administrators
Education activists
Grand Officers of the Order of Orange-Nassau
Knights of the Order of the Netherlands Lion
Members of the House of Representatives (Netherlands)
Municipal councillors in South Holland
State Secretaries for Education of the Netherlands
State Secretaries for the Interior of the Netherlands
Utrecht University alumni
Academic staff of Utrecht University
People from Barneveld
People from Ede, Netherlands
People from Gouda, South Holland
20th-century Dutch educators
20th-century Dutch politicians